Timarcha intricata is a species of leaf beetle in the family Chrysomelidae. It is found in North America.

References

Further reading

 
 

Chrysomelinae
Articles created by Qbugbot
Beetles described in 1853
Wingless beetles